Kunratice u Cvikova is a municipality and village in Česká Lípa District in the Liberec Region of the Czech Republic. It has about 600 inhabitants.

History
Kunratice u Cvikova was probably founded around 1278. In 1388, the village was acquired by the Berka of Dubá family and incorporated it under the Milštejn estate.

Sights
The Church of the Exaltation of the Holy Cross was built in the Empire style in 1833. In 2021, a valuable Holy Sepulchre (symbolic depiction of Christ's tomb) decorated with glass was discovered in the church.

In the center of the village stands a colored cast-iron statue of Emperor Joseph II from 1882.

References

Villages in Česká Lípa District
Lusatian Mountains